The kingdom of Uí Fháilghe, Uí Failge (early spelling) or Uíbh Fhailí (modern spelling) was a Gaelic-Irish kingdom which existed to 1550, the name of which (though not the territory) is preserved in the name of County Offaly (Irish: Contae Uíbh Fhailí), Ireland.

County Offaly was constructed from elements of a number of ancient Irish Kingdoms of which Uí Failghe was one amongst such as Mide (present day west Offaly) and Munster (present day south Offaly). In modern territorial boundaries the kingdom today would correspond with County Offaly east of Tullamore, western parts of Kildare and parts of north east Laois. The name was also retained in the names of two baronies in County Kildare that formed part of the kingdom, Offaly (Ophaley) East and Offaly (Ophaley) West.

Background

Uí Failghe may have existed as a kingdom from the early historic era. It takes its name from the legendary king Rus Failge (fl. AD 507–514). It successfully fought off encroachments by the Uí Néill, the Eóganachta, and the Normans however with loss of territories.  "The traditions of warfare in the fifth century between Ui Neill and Laigin in Brega and Mide ... [show] the Ui Failgi certainly suffered most material damage through the loss of territory in Offaly and Westmeath".

From the mid eleventh century its ruling dynasty adopted the surname Ua Conchobhair Failghe (modern spelling: Ua Conchúir Fhailí) or O Connor Faly (they were unrelated to the other notable Ua Conchobhair dynasties of Connacht and Kerry). Their seat was originally in Rathangan but moved to Daingean with the Norman arrival. On the death of the last de facto king, Brian mac Chathaoir Uí Chonchúir Fhailí, about 1556, the Parliament of Ireland passed the Settlement of Laois and Offaly Act and Ui Failghe was divided between Queen's County, King's County and County Kildare during one of the Plantations of Ireland. Upon Irish independence in 1922, 'King's County' was renamed County Offaly in commemoration of Uí Failghe.

Description

The old territory of Offaly is described by O'Donovan in his Ordnance Survey letters. O'Donovan notes the territory of Ui Failghe, or Ophaley, comprising the baronies of: Geshill, Upper and Lower Philipstown, Warrenstown, and Collestown all in King's County; Ophaley (or Offaley) in County Kildare; Portnahinch and Tinahinch in Queen's County. O'Donovan cites O'Heerin as giving that Offaly was originally subdivided into seven cantreds: Tuath Geisille (Geashill); Hy-Regan (Tinahinch); Clann-Maoilughra (Upper Philipstown and Portnahinch); Clar Colgain (Lower Philipstown); Tuath-Maighe or Tethmoy (Coolestown and Warrenstown); Magh Aoife, or Fearann Uí Mhurcháin, (northern half of the Ophaley); Tuath Leighe (southern half of Ophaley).

This gives the kingdom an approximately triangular shape, with a southwest corner in the Slieve Bloom Mountains, a southeast corner at Dún Ailinne, and the River Boyne and its tributaries (Milltown River, Yellow River) marking its northern border.

Keating cites the following family branches as belonging to the Ó Conchubhar Fhailghe: "Ó Caomhánaigh, Ó Tuathalaigh, Ó Branaigh, Mac Giolla Phádraig, Ó  Duinn, Ó Díomasaigh, Ó Duibhir, Ó Conchúir (Of Offaly and North Wexford), Muintear Riain."

See also

 Kings of Ui Failghe
 Irish kings
 Gaelic Ireland
 Loígis

References

 Hui Failgi relations with the Hui Neill in the century after the loss of the plain of Mide, Alfred P. Smyth, Etudes Celtic, 1975, pp. 501–523.
 Ui Fhailghe, Uibh Fhaili, etc.; The Name of Offaly, Nollaig O Muraile, in Offaly Heritage:Journal of the Offaly Archaeological and Historical Society, pp. 9–11, volume one, 2003

Kingdoms of medieval Ireland
History of County Offaly
History of County Laois
History of County Kildare
1556 disestablishments
Laigin
Gaels